The Battle of Phase Line Bullet was one of a series of engagements that led to the destruction of the Tawakalna Iraqi Republican Guard Division, on 26 February 1991, by a simultaneous attack of the 1st and 3rd armored divisions, the 1st Infantry Division, and the 2nd Armored Cavalry Regiment (2ACR) during the Persian Gulf War. 

The 3rd Armored Division advanced to the west through a corridor between the 1st Armored Division in the north and  the  2ACR in the south. The Bradley squadron that spearheaded the assault was beaten back by a screen of Iraqi entrenched infantry, APCs, and Iraqi T-72 tanks. The incident also involved American friendly fire casualties caused by M1 Abrams tanks operating in the rearguard. The action forced to halt the offensive of the 3rd Armored Division until dawn. The Iraqi troops were eventually dislodged from their positions by close air support and artillery fire during the early hours of 27 February.

Background

The initial skirmishes between American and Iraqi Republican Guard units took place earlier that day around the grid reference line 73 Easting, some 30 miles west of  Wadi al Batin, where the 2ACR managed to destroy two Iraqi armored brigades. The skirmishes in this sector were still going on when the 3rd Armored Division (3AD) positioned north, made the first contact with a brigade of the Tawakalna Armored Division around 03:30 pm. The scouts of the division made contact with the Iraqi army just after they crossed the grid reference line Phase Line Bullet.

Weather conditions were extremely poor, hampering identification of targets and preventing the use of helicopters in reconnaissance missions.

Battle

Flank screen maneuver 
As the usual practice for armored reconnaissance, a troop of M3 Bradleys (Alpha Troop), belonging to the 4th  Squadron of the 7th Cavalry Regiment, along with an attached platoon of Armored Personnel Carriers, belonging to 2nd Platoon Charlie Company, of the 23rd Combat Engineer Battalion, was scouting ahead of the main tank force.
The flank screen maneuver occurred along the southern boundaries between the 2ACR and the  3AD operational areas. Task Forces 4-34 and 4-32 were advancing from the rear. The general movement of the US forces followed an eastward direction. The fumes from hundreds of oil wells set on fire by the Iraqis, combined with an intense shamal, forced the US vehicles to use thermal sights.

Surprising contact and retreat 
At 03:00pm, the reconnaissance troop of 14 Bradleys received information from the GHQ of the 3rd Armored Division that no enemy unit remained between them and the Kuwaiti border. Suddenly, they found a screen line of Iraqi APCs straight ahead, barely  to the east. The poor weather and burning oil fumes reduced the visibility conditions.  

A burst of small arms and heavy machine gunfire, RPGs and Sagger anti-tank missiles erupted.  Initially, the American commander thought they were engaging dismounted infantry supported by BMPs. Still more, he later realized that they were also receiving main-gun tank rounds. The US vehicles retaliated by firing TOW missiles, 25 mm cannon and machine guns. The contact lasted about two hours until the Bradleys, battered by the enemy and friendly fire and running out of ammunition, were forced to withdraw to the west.

American M1 Abrams tanks from TF 4-34, positioned in the rear echelon, fired in support of the IFVs, destroying at least one T-72 and several Iraqi APCs. They also hit three Bradleys (A-24, A-31 and A-22), causing two American deaths. The 2ACR also became entangled in the fighting from the rear right.

Another Bradley (A-36) was first disabled by a 12.7 mm round from an NSVT heavy machine gun which penetrated the transmission and later shattered by a large caliber, shaped charge impact in the turret's front. Bradley A-35 also took some damage from a mix of ricocheting 12.7 mm bursts and indirect fire, but was able to drive out, while A-33 suffered two injured and its radio station was hit by 12.7 mm fire. During the rescue of casualties from A-24, Bradley A-26, commanded by Sergeant Major Ronald Sneed, was near-missed by two T-72 main rounds, which spattered the vehicle with splinters. While providing cover for A-21 who was attempting to assess the situation with A-36, Bradley A-22, commanded by Staff Sergeant Meyers, was struck in the turret by an M-1 tank from TF 4-34, killing one of the crew. The gunner of A-24 was also killed by tank fire from friendly US forces.

The disabled A-22, A-36 and A-24 were left abandoned on the battleground, while A-31, although heavily damaged by friendly tank fire, was able to pull back. All the surviving Bradleys were raked by machine gun fire and shell splinters, but they remained operational.

Aftermath
American forces could not find a breach in the northern Iraqi lines until the first hours of  February 27. The commander of the 3rd Armored Division, General Funk, ordered to stop the assault until daylight. Funk requested air support from 24 Apache helicopters, A-10 aircraft and artillery to deal with the Iraqi positions at night. Later in the morning, 7th Cav scouts found the hulls of 18 APCs, mostly BMP-1s, and six T-72s disabled or abandoned by their crews. The commander of Alpha troop, Captain Gerald Davie, acknowledged that his force was "ten times too close to the enemy than we would choose to be."

References

Bibliography
 Atkinson, Rick (1993) Crusade, The untold story of the Persian Gulf War. Houghton Mifflin Company. 
 Rostker, Bernard (1998) Environmental Exposure Report:Depleted Uranium in the Gulf. DoD Publication.
 Wunderlich, Sgt. Tony (1991) Lucky Scouts Dodge "Big Bullets" That Ripped Their Bradley Armor magazine, May–June, 1991, pp. 22-23.
 Bin, Albert, Hill, Richard, Jones, Archer (1998) Desert Storm: A Forgotten War. Greenwood Publishing Group. 
 Lowry, Richard S. (2003) The Gulf War Chronicles: A Military History of the First War with Iraq. iUniverse, inc. 
 

Phase Line Bullet
Phase Line Bullet
Friendly fire incidents
1991 in Iraq
Phase Line Bullet
Phase Line Bullet
Phase Line Bullet
February 1991 events in Asia